The Archita is a right tributary of the river Scroafa in Romania. It discharges into the Scroafa near Mureni.

References

Rivers of Romania
Rivers of Mureș County